The House of Keșco or Keșcu/Cheșcu,, was the name of an ancient Moldavian Boyar noble family whose members held significant positions in Moldavia and later in the Russian Empire and Romania. Most notable member was Natalia Keshko, who later became first modern Queen of Serbia.

History
According to historian Johann Svoboda, the family had its roots in Russia, where members of the family appeared in 1097 as Knyazen in the Principality of Kiev. According to him, the family has descended from Rurik dynasty, in particular from the Wassilko, Prince of Rostov (1209–1238).

In Moldavia
Historically, the family was established even before the Principality of Moldova was founded in 1350. They owned the forest on the left bank of the 
Sereth river, Panka region, Mihodra river valley and founded Lucavăţ, which was all owned by Luca, member of the family. The family is said to be, along with the House of Dragoș, the oldest in this region. Luca's sons Stan and Șerbco were knights at the court of Prince Alexander I of Moldavia. He officially confirmed their family possessions of Lucavăţ, Panka with Mihodra with hereditary rights for their descendants by the document of February 16, 1428.

The church of Lucavăţ became first seat of Bishopric of Rădăuți, with its pastor, by proclamation of Prince Stephen the Great of Moldavia became its first Bishop on March 15, 1490. Prince Alexandru Lăpușneanu of Moldavia, grandson of Prince Alexander "the Good", not only confirmed the legality of the certificate issued by his grandfather on May 7, 1565, but also subsequently transferred to the family the co-ownership of a large number of villages in northern Moldova which expanded the land they owned. Later, during 17th century, brothers Vasile, Nicolae and Constantin Căzăcescul were again officially confirmed ownership of all their expanded possessions by Prince Illias III of Moldavia on March 12, 1667.

Wassilko von Serecki
Vasile (Basilius) Căzăcescul (1631–1701), the eldest of the above mentioned brothers, married in 1654 Candachia Cocoranul (1635–1688), the daughter of the Boyar Isac Cocoranul. He was, as historian Teodor Bălan wrote, the ancestor of the Counts Wassilko von Serecki, who were later one of the largest landowners in Austro-Hungarian Empire and the only family of ethnic Romanian origin to acquire the title of Count throughout the Empire.

Keshko family name
It was first mentioned as such in the 17th century. Constantin the Căzăcescul, younger brother of the above mentioned Vasile (Basilius) (1631–1701) and Nicolae, got confirmed in 1667 his noble status and his possessions in the Principality of Moldova by ruling Prince Illias III. His descendants kept using his nickname as their family name, making him an ancestor of the Keshko (Keșco/Keșcu/Cheșcu) family, which in turn made them collateral branch of Counts Wassilko von Serecki.

In the Russian Empire
Members of the Keshko family served the Russian Empire. As such they held the title of Marshals of Nobility of the Bessarabia Governorate (1812–1917) where they held large properties. Throughout the years they were also incorporated into the Russian nobility, apart from already belonging to Romanian and Moldavian nobility.

Family tree
Constantin Căzăcescul, whose descendants adopted and used Keșco version of his nickname as their official surname, married Irina Ţica, daughter of Eni Tica, Great Pitar of Moldavia
Gheorghe Keșco, married Ilinca Stârcea, daughter of Ioan Stârcea
Peter Keșco (died in 1790), married firstly Balasa Vârnav; married secondly Ecaterina Kogălniceanu
Maria Keșco, married Şeptilici
daughter, married Gheorghe, a Captain in Moldavian army
Ioanita Keșco (died in 1817), married Tsaritsa Costache (Costaki) (born in 1785), daughter of Manolache Costaki and Princess Ileana Rosetti
Ioan Keșco, (1809–1863), Great Vornic of Moldavia, Russian Marshal of Nobility in Bessarabia, married firstly Romanian noblewoman Natalia Balș (1812–1830), daughter of Iordache Balș, Grand treasurer of Moldova and Princess Ruxandra Sturdza (1785–1844), married secondly Zamfira Kalmutki (1819-1881), daughter of Gheorghe Kalmutki  
Petre Keșco (1830–1865), Colonel in Russian Imperial Army, married his relative Princess Pulcheria Sturdza of Moldavia (1831–1874)
Natalie Keșco, Queen consort of Serbia (1859–1941) married her second cousin, King Milan I of Serbia.
Ioana Ecaterina Keșco (1860-1934), who married on 5 February 1883 her relative Prince Eugen Ghica-Comănești (1840–1912). 
Maria Keșco (1861–1935), who married on 13 April 1886 Prince Grigor Ghica-Brigadier (1847–1913). 
Ioniță (Ioann) Keșco (died in 1877), only brother; he was the fourth and the last child.
Viktoria Keșco (1835-1856), after capturing the heart of Archduke Ferdinand Maximilian in Vienna, her father forcefully married her off to her brothers comrade and her longtime admirer, Bessarabian nobleman of Greek descent Alexander Dimitrievich Inglezi (1826-1903), son of Dimitri Spiridonovich Inglezi (1771-1846).
Viktoria Keșco (born in 1802), who married Belorussian nobleman Felix Wakar, Korwin Coat of Arms (1792-1865).
Gheorghe Keșco (born in 1813)
Mihalche
Constantin Keşco
Ilinca Keşco
Nastasia Keşco, married Ilie Criste, Moldavian Knight
Mihail Keșco (died in 1727)

House in Chișinău

Family members

References

Sources

Moldavian nobility
Moldavian families
People from Bessarabia Governorate